San Cosme may refer to:

 San Cosme metro station, Mexico City
 San Cosme Department, Argentina
 San Cosme, Corrientes, Argentina
 San Cosme y Damián, Paraguay